Legislative Reorganization Act may refer to either of two acts of the United States Congress that changed the procedures under which Congress operates:
 Legislative Reorganization Act of 1946
 Legislative Reorganization Act of 1970